Dragan Gaži (1930-1983) was a Croatian painter. His works can be found at the Croatian Museum of Naïve Art in Zagreb.

References

1930 births
1983 deaths
20th-century Croatian painters
Croatian male painters
20th-century Croatian male artists